Skråholmen is an islet about 2 miles (3 km) northeast of Schareholmane. It is part of Thousand Islands, an archipelago south of Edgeøya.

References

 Norwegian Polar Institute Place Names of Svalbard Database

Islands of Svalbard